Mohamed Zaree is an Egyptian human rights activist. He is the Egypt country director for the Cairo Institute for Human Rights Studies (CIHRS) and the leader of the Forum of Independent Egyptian Human Rights NGOs. He was the recipient of the 2017 Martin Ennals Award for Human Rights Defenders. He is currently banned from leaving the country by the Egyptian government.

Zaree attended Cairo University, where he obtained a Bachelor's Degree from the Faculty of Law in 2002 and a graduate diploma in Civil Society and Human Rights in 2004. He worked for United Group, Nazra for Feminist Studies, and Catholic Relief Services before joining CIHRS in 2011. He is married and has two daughters.

References

Living people
Human rights activists from Cairo
Year of birth missing (living people)